Sikkim is a state in Northeastern India. It borders the Tibet Autonomous Region of China in the north and northeast, Bhutan in the east, Province No. 1 of Nepal in the west and West Bengal in the south. Sikkim is also close to the Siliguri Corridor, which borders Bangladesh. Sikkim is the least populous and second smallest among the Indian states. Situated in the Eastern Himalaya, Sikkim is notable for its biodiversity, including alpine and subtropical climates, as well as being a host to Kangchenjunga, the highest peak in India and third highest on Earth. Sikkim's capital and largest city is Gangtok. Almost 35% of the state is covered by Khangchendzonga National Park – a UNESCO World Heritage Site.

The Kingdom of Sikkim was founded by the Namgyal dynasty in the 17th century. It was ruled by Buddhist priest-kings known as the Chogyal. It became a princely state of British India in 1890. Following Indian independence, Sikkim continued its protectorate status with the Union of India after 1947, and the Republic of India after 1950. It enjoyed the highest literacy rate and per capita income among Himalayan states. In 1973, anti-royalist riots took place in front of the Chogyal's palace. In 1975, after the Indian Army took over the city of Gangtok, a referendum was held that led to the dissolution of the monarchy and Sikkim joining India as its 22nd state.

Modern Sikkim is a multiethnic and multilingual Indian state. The official languages of the state are English, Nepali, Sikkimese and Lepcha. Additional official languages include Gurung, Limbu, Magar, Mukhia, Newari, Rai, Sherpa and Tamang for the purpose of preservation of culture and tradition in the state. English is taught in schools and used in government documents. The predominant religions are Hinduism and Vajrayana Buddhism. Sikkim's economy is largely dependent on agriculture and tourism. , the state had the fifth-smallest GDP among Indian states, although it is also among the fastest-growing.

Sikkim achieved its ambition to convert its agriculture to fully organic between 2003 and 2016, and became the first state in India to achieve this distinction. It is also among India's most environmentally conscious states, having banned plastic water bottles "in any government functions and meetings" and polystyrene products (throughout the state).

Toponymy 
The origin theory of the name Sikkim is that it is a combination of two Limbu words: su, which means "new", and khyim, which means "palace" or "house". The Tibetan name for Sikkim is Drenjong (Wylie-transliteration: 'bras ljongs), which means "valley of rice", while the Bhutias call it Beyul Demazong, which means '"the hidden valley of rice". According to folklore, after establishing Rabdentse as his new capital, Bhutia king Tensung Namgyal built a palace and asked his Limbu Queen to name it. The Lepcha people, the original inhabitants of Sikkim, called it Nye-mae-el, meaning "paradise". In historical Indian literature, Sikkim is known as Indrakil, the garden of the war god Indra.

History 

The Lepchas are considered to be the earliest inhabitants of Sikkim. However the Limbus and the Magars also lived in the inaccessible parts of West and South districts as early as the Lepchas perhaps lived in the East and North districts. The Buddhist saint Padmasambhava, also known as Guru Rinpoche, is said to have passed through the land in the 8th century. The Guru is reported to have blessed the land, introduced Buddhism, and foretold the era of monarchy that would arrive in Sikkim centuries later.

Foundation of the monarchy 

According to legend, Khye Bumsa, a 14th-century prince from the Minyak House in Kham in eastern Tibet, received a divine revelation instructing him to travel south to seek his fortunes. A fifth-generation descendant of Khye Bumsa, Phuntsog Namgyal, became the founder of Sikkim's monarchy in 1642, when he was consecrated as the first Chogyal, or priest-king, of Sikkim by the three venerated lamas at Yuksom.
Phuntsog Namgyal was succeeded in 1670 by his son, Tensung Namgyal, who moved the capital from Yuksom to Rabdentse (near modern Pelling). In 1700, Sikkim was invaded by the Bhutanese with the help of the half-sister of the Chogyal, who had been denied the throne. The Bhutanese were driven away by the Tibetan people, who restored the throne to the Chogyal ten years later. Between 1717 and 1733, the kingdom faced many raids by the Nepalese in the west and Bhutanese in the east, culminating with the destruction of the capital Rabdentse by the Nepalese. In 1791, China sent troops to support Sikkim and defend Tibet against the Gorkha Kingdom. Following the subsequent defeat of Gorkha, the Chinese Qing dynasty established control over Sikkim.

During the British Raj 

Following the beginning of British rule in neighbouring India, Sikkim allied with Britain against their common adversary, Nepal. The Nepalese attacked Sikkim, overrunning most of the region including the Terai. This prompted the British East India Company to attack Nepal, resulting in the Gurkha War of 1814. Treaties signed between Sikkim and Nepal resulted in the return of the territory annexed by the Nepalese in 1817. However, ties between Sikkim and the British weakened when the latter began taxation of the Morang region. In 1849, two British physicians, Sir Joseph Dalton Hooker and Dr. Archibald Campbell, the latter being in charge of relations between the British and Sikkimese governments, ventured into the mountains of Sikkim unannounced and unauthorised. The doctors were detained by the Sikkimese government, leading to a punitive British expedition against the kingdom, after which the Darjeeling district and Morang were annexed to British India in 1853. The Chogyal of Sikkim became a titular ruler under the directive of the British governor as a result of the invasion.

Sikkim became a British protectorate in the later decades of the 19th century, formalised by a convention signed with China in 1890. Sikkim was gradually granted more sovereignty over the next three decades, and became a member of the Chamber of Princes, the assembly representing the rulers of the Indian princely states, in 1922.

Indian protectorate 
Prior to Indian independence, Jawaharlal Nehru, as the Vice President of the Executive Council, pushed through a resolution in the Indian Constituent Assembly to the effect that Sikkim and Bhutan, as Himalayan states, were not 'Indian states' and their future should be negotiated separately. A standstill agreement was signed in February 1948.

Meanwhile, Indian independence and its move to democracy spurred a fledgling political movement in Sikkim, giving rise to the formation of Sikkim State Congress (SSC), a pro-accession political party. The party sent a plate of demands to the palace, including a demand for accession to India. The palace attempted to defuse the movement by appointing three secretaries from the SSC to the government and sponsoring a counter-movement in the name of Sikkim National Party, which opposed accession to India.

The demand for responsible government continued and the SSC launched a civil disobedience movement. The Chogyal Palden Thondup Namgyal asked India for help in quelling the movement, which was offered in the form of a small military police force and an Indian Dewan. In 1950, a treaty was agreed between India and Sikkim which gave Sikkim the status of an Indian protectorate. Sikkim came under the suzerainty of India, which controlled its external affairs, defence, diplomacy and communications. In other respects, Sikkim retained administrative autonomy.

A state council was established in 1953 to allow for constitutional government under the Chogyal.  Despite pressures from an India "bent on annexation", Chogyal Palden Thondup Namgyal was able to preserve autonomy and shape a "model Asian state" where the literacy rate and per capita income were twice as high as neighbouring Nepal, Bhutan and India. Meanwhile, the Sikkim National Congress demanded fresh elections and greater representation for Nepalis in Sikkim. People marched on the palace against the monarchy. In 1973, anti-royalist riots took place in front of the Chogyal's palace.

Merger and statehood 

In 1975, the Prime Minister of Sikkim appealed to the Indian Parliament for Sikkim to become a state of India. In April of that year, the Indian Army took over the city of Gangtok and disarmed the Chogyal's palace guards. Thereafter, a referendum was held in which 97.5 per cent of voters supported abolishing the monarchy, effectively approving union with India. India is said to have stationed 20,000–40,000 troops in a country of only 200,000 during the referendum. On 16 May 1975, Sikkim became the 22nd state of the Indian Union, and the monarchy was abolished. To enable the incorporation of the new state, the Indian Parliament amended the Indian Constitution. First, the 35th Amendment laid down a set of conditions that made Sikkim an "Associate State", a special designation not used by any other state. A month later, the 36th Amendment repealed the 35th Amendment, and made Sikkim a full state, adding its name to the First Schedule of the Constitution.

Recent history 
In 2000, the seventeenth Karmapa, Urgyen Trinley Dorje, who had been confirmed by the Dalai Lama and accepted as a tulku by the Chinese government, escaped from Tibet, seeking to return to the Rumtek Monastery in Sikkim. Chinese officials were in a quandary on this issue, as any protests to India would mean an explicit endorsement of India's governance of Sikkim, which China still recognised as an independent state occupied by India. The Chinese government eventually recognised Sikkim as an Indian state in 2003, in return for India declaring Tibet as a "part of" the territory of China; New Delhi had accepted Tibet as part of China way back in 1954, but China appears to have believed that the agreement had lapsed.  The 2003 agreement led to a thaw in Sino-Indian relations. On 6 July 2006, the Sikkimese Himalayan pass of Nathu La was opened to cross-border trade, becoming the first open border between India and China. The pass, which was first opened during the 1904 Younghusband Expedition to Tibet, had remained closed since the 1962 Sino-Indian War.

On 18 September 2011, a magnitude 6.9Mw earthquake struck Sikkim, killing at least 116 people in the state and in Nepal, Bhutan, Bangladesh and Tibet. More than 60 people died in Sikkim alone, and the city of Gangtok suffered significant damage.

Geography 

Situated in the Himalayan mountains, the state of Sikkim is characterised by mountainous terrain. The summit of Kangchenjunga, the world's third-highest peak, is the state's highest point, situated on the border between Sikkim and Nepal. For the most part, the land is unfit for agriculture because of the rocky, precipitous slopes. However, some hill slopes have been converted into terrace farms.

Numerous snow-fed streams have carved out river valleys in the west and south of the state. These streams combine into the major Teesta River and its tributary, the Rangeet, which flow through the state from north to south. About a third of the state is heavily forested.
The Himalayan mountains surround the northern, eastern and western borders of Sikkim. The Lower Himalayas, lying in the southern reaches of the state, are the most densely populated.

The state has 28 mountain peaks, more than 80 glaciers, 227 high-altitude lakes (including the Tsongmo, Gurudongmar and Khecheopalri Lakes), five major hot springs, and more than 100 rivers and streams. Eight mountain passes connect the state to Tibet, Bhutan and Nepal.

Sikkim's hot springs are renowned for their medicinal and therapeutic value. Among the state's most notable hot springs are those at Phurchachu, Yumthang, Borang, Ralang, Taram-chu and Yumey Samdong. The springs, which have a high sulphur content, are located near river banks; some are known to emit hydrogen.

Geology

The hills of Sikkim mainly consist of gneiss and schist which weather to produce generally poor and shallow brown clay soils. The soil is coarse, with large concentrations of iron oxide; it ranges from neutral to acidic and is lacking in organic and mineral nutrients. This type of soil tends to support evergreen and deciduous forests.

The rock consists of phyllites and schists, and is highly susceptible to weathering and erosion. This, combined with the state's heavy rainfall, causes extensive soil erosion and the loss of soil nutrients through leaching. As a result, landslides are frequent, often isolating rural towns and villages from the major urban centres.

Climate 
The state has five seasons: winter, summer, spring, autumn, and monsoon season. Sikkim's climate ranges from sub-tropical in the south to tundra in the north. Most of the inhabited regions of Sikkim experience a temperate climate, with temperatures seldom exceeding  in summer.

Sikkim is one of the few states in India to receive regular snowfall. The tundra-type region in the north is snowbound for four months every year, and the temperature drops below  almost every night.

During the monsoon, heavy rains increase the risk of landslides. The record for the longest period of continuous rain in Sikkim is 11 days. Fog affects many parts of the state during winter and the monsoons, making transportation perilous.

Flora and fauna 

Sikkim is situated in an ecological hotspot of the lower Himalayas, one of only three among the ecoregions of India. The forested regions of the state exhibit a diverse range of fauna and flora. Owing to its altitudinal gradation, the state has a wide variety of plants, from tropical species to temperate, alpine and tundra ones, and is perhaps one of the few regions to exhibit such a diversity within such a small area. Nearly 81 per cent of the area of Sikkim comes under the administration of its forest department.

Sikkim is home to around 5,000 species of flowering plants, 515 rare orchids, 60 primula species, 36 rhododendron species, 11 oak varieties, 23 bamboo varieties, 16 conifer species, 362 types of ferns and ferns allies, 8 tree ferns, and over 900 medicinal plants. A relative of the Poinsettia, locally known as "Christmas Flower", can be found in abundance in the mountainous state. The Noble Dendrobium is the official flower of Sikkim, while the rhododendron is the state tree.

Orchids, figs, laurel, bananas, sal trees and bamboo grow in the Himalayan subtropical broadleaf forests of the lower altitudes of Sikkim. In the temperate elevations above  there are Eastern Himalayan broadleaf forests, where oaks, chestnuts, maples, birches, alders, and magnolias grow in large numbers, as well as Himalayan subtropical pine forests, dominated by Chir pine. In lower elevations are found juniper, pine, firs, cypresses and rhododendrons from the Eastern Himalayan subalpine conifer forests. Higher up are Eastern Himalayan alpine shrub and meadows and high-altitude wetlands, which are home to a wide variety of rhododendrons and wildflowers.

The fauna of Sikkim include the snow leopard, musk deer,  Himalayan tahr, red panda, Himalayan marmot, Himalayan serow, Himalayan goral, muntjac, common langur, Asian black bear, clouded leopard, marbled cat, leopard cat, dhole, Tibetan wolf, hog badger, binturong, and Himalayan jungle cat. Among the animals more commonly found in the alpine zone are yaks, mainly reared for their milk, meat, and as a beast of burden.

The avifauna of Sikkim include the impeyan pheasant, crimson horned pheasant, snow partridge, Tibetan snowcock, bearded vulture and griffon vulture, as well as golden eagles, quails, plovers, woodcocks, sandpipers, pigeons, Old World flycatchers, babblers and robins. Sikkim has more than 550 species of birds, some of which have been declared endangered.

Sikkim also has a rich diversity of arthropods, many of which remain unstudied. Some of the most understudied species are Sikkimese arthropods, specifically butterflies. Of the approximately 1,438 butterfly species found in the Indian subcontinent, 695 have been recorded in Sikkim. These include the endangered Kaiser-i-hind, the Yellow Gorgon and the Bhutan Glory.

National Parks and Wildlife Sanctuaries

List of National Parks and Wildlife Sanctuaries of Sikkim:
 Khangchendzonga National Park
 Pangolakha Wildlife Sanctuary
 Fambong Lho Wildlife Sanctuary
 Kyongnosla Alpine Sanctuary
 Maenam Wildlife Sanctuary
 Barsey Rhododendron Sanctuary
 Shingba Rhododendron Sanctuary

Government and politics 

According to the Constitution of India, Sikkim has a parliamentary system of representative democracy for its governance; universal suffrage is granted to state residents.  The government structure is organised into three branches:

 Executive: As with all states of India, a governor stands at the head of the executive power of state, just as the president is the head of the executive power in the Union, and is appointed by the President of India. The governor's appointment is largely ceremonial, and his or her main role is to oversee the swearing-in of the chief minister. The chief minister, who holds the real executive powers, is the head of the party or coalition garnering the largest majority in the state elections. The governor also appoints cabinet ministers on the advice of the chief minister.
 Legislature: Sikkim has a unicameral legislature, the Sikkim Legislative Assembly, like most other Indian states. Its state assembly has 32 seats, including one reserved for the Sangha. Sikkim is allocated one seat in each of the two chambers of India's national bicameral legislature, the Lok Sabha and the Rajya Sabha.
 Judiciary: The judiciary consists of the Sikkim High Court and a system of lower courts. The High Court, located at Gangtok, has a Chief Justice along with two permanent justices. The Sikkim High Court is the smallest state high court in the country.

In 1975, after the abrogation of Sikkim's monarchy, the Indian National Congress gained a majority in the 1977 elections. In 1979, after a period of instability, a popular ministry headed by Nar Bahadur Bhandari, leader of the Sikkim Sangram Parishad Party, was sworn in. Bhandari held on to power in the 1984 and 1989 elections. In the 1994 elections, Pawan Kumar Chamling of the Sikkim Democratic Front became the Chief Minister of the state. Chamling and his party had since held on to power by winning the 1999, 2004, 2009 and 2014 elections. However, the 2019 legislative assembly elections were won by the Sikkim Krantikari Morcha party and the chief minister since then is Prem Singh Tamang. The current Governor of Sikkim is Lakshman Acharya.

Subdivisions 
Sikkim has six districts – Gangtok District, Mangan District, Namchi District, Pakyong District, Geyzing District and Soreng District. The district capitals are Gangtok, Mangan, Namchi, Pakyong, Gyalshing and Soreng respectively. These six districts are further divided into 16 subdivisions; Pakyong, Rongli, Rangpo and Gangtok are the subdivisions of the Gangtok and Pakyong Districts. Soreng, Yuksom, Gyalshing and Dentam are the subdivisions of the Geyzing and Soreng district. Chungthang, Dzongu, Kabi and Mangan are the subdivisions of the Mangan district. Ravongla, Jorethang, Namchi and Yangyang are the subdivisions of the Namchi district.

Each of Sikkim's districts is overseen by a state government appointee, the district collector, who is in charge of the administration of the civilian areas of the district. The Indian Army has control over a large part of the state, as Sikkim forms part of a sensitive border area with China. Many areas are restricted to foreigners, and official permits are needed to visit them.

Economy 

Sikkim's nominal state gross domestic product (GDP) was estimated at US$4.6 billion in 2019, with GDP per capita being $7,530 (₹ 5,50,000) thus constituting the third-smallest GDP among India's 28 states. The state's economy is largely agrarian based on the terraced farming of rice and the cultivation of crops such as maize, millet, wheat, barley, oranges, tea, and cardamom. Sikkim produces more cardamom than any other Indian state and is home to the largest cultivated area of cardamom.

Because of its hilly terrain and poor transport infrastructure, Sikkim lacks a large-scale industrial base. Brewing, distilling, tanning and watchmaking are the main industries and are mainly located in the southern regions of the state, primarily in the towns of Melli and Jorethang. In addition, a small mining industry exists in Sikkim extracting minerals such as copper, dolomite, talc, graphite, quartzite, coal, zinc, and lead. Despite the state's minimal industrial infrastructure, Sikkim's economy has been among the fastest-growing in India since 2000; the state's GDP expanded by 89.93% in 2010 alone. In 2003, Sikkim decided to fully convert to organic farming and achieved this goal in 2015 becoming India's first "organic state".

In recent years, the government of Sikkim has extensively promoted tourism. As a result, state revenue has increased 14 times since the mid-1990s. Sikkim has furthermore invested in a fledgling gambling industry promoting both casinos and online gambling. The state's first casino, the Casino Sikkim, opened in March 2009. In the year 2010 the government subsequently issued three gambling licenses for casinos and online sports betting in general. The Playwin lottery has been a notable success in the state.

The opening of the Nathu La pass on 6 July 2006, connecting Lhasa, Tibet, to India, was billed as a boon for Sikkim's economy. Trade through the pass remains hampered by Sikkim's limited infrastructure and government restrictions in both India and China, though the volume of traded goods has been steadily increasing.

Transport

Air 

Sikkim did not have any operational airport for a long time because of its rough terrain. It has been constructed by the Airports Authority of India on 200 acres of land. The airport is capable of operating ATR aircraft.

Before October 2018, the closest operational airport to Sikkim was Bagdogra Airport near Siliguri in northern West Bengal. A daily helicopter service run by the Sikkim Helicopter Service connects Gangtok to Bagdogra; the flight is thirty minutes long, operates only once a day, and can carry four people. The Gangtok helipad is the only civilian helipad in the state.

Roads 

National Highway 10 (NH 10; formerly NH 31A) links Siliguri to Gangtok. Sikkim Nationalised Transport runs bus and truck services. Privately run bus, tourist taxi, and jeep services operate throughout Sikkim and also connect it to Siliguri. A branch of the highway from Melli connects western Sikkim. Towns in eastern, southern and western Sikkim are connected to the hill stations of Kalimpong and Darjeeling in northern West Bengal. The state is furthermore connected to Tibet by the mountain pass of Nathu La.

List of National Highways of Sikkim:

Rail 
Sikkim lacks significant railway infrastructure. The closest major railway stations are Siliguri Junction and New Jalpaiguri in neighbouring West Bengal. However, the New Sikkim Railway Project has been launched to connect the town of Rangpo in Sikkim with Sevoke on the West Bengal border. This line is Sevoke-Rangpo Railway Line from Sivok railway station to Rangpo railway station. The five-station line is intended to support both economic development and Indian Army operations and was initially planned to be completed by 2015, though as of 2013 its construction has met with delays. The railway line up to Rangpo is expected to be completed in 2021. In the second phase the line will be extended up to Gangtok. In addition, the Ministry of Railways proposed plans in 2010 for railway lines linking Mirik in West Bengal to Namchi, Daramdin, Ranipool, and Gangtok.

Infrastructure 

Sikkim's roads are maintained by the Border Roads Organisation (BRO), an offshoot of the Indian Army. The roads in southern Sikkim are in relatively good condition, landslides being less frequent in this region. The state government maintains  of roadways that do not fall under the BRO's jurisdiction.

Sikkim receives most of its electricity from 19 hydroelectric power stations. Power is also obtained from the National Thermal Power Corporation and Power Grid Corporation of India. By 2006, the state had achieved 100 per cent rural electrification. However, the voltage remains unstable and voltage stabilisers are needed. Per capita consumption of electricity in Sikkim was approximately 182 kWh in 2006. The state government has promoted biogas and solar power for cooking, but these have received a poor response and are used mostly for lighting purposes. In 2005, 73.2 per cent of Sikkim's households were reported to have access to safe drinking water, and the state's large number of mountain streams assures a sufficient water supply.

On 8 December 2008, it was announced that Sikkim had become the first state in India to achieve 100 per cent sanitation coverage, becoming completely free of public defecation, thus attaining the status of "Nirmal State".

Demographics 

Sikkim is India's least populous state, with 610,577 inhabitants according to the 2011 census. Sikkim is also one of the least densely populated Indian states, with only 86 persons per square kilometre. However, it has a high population growth rate, averaging 12.36% per cent between 2001 and 2011. The sex ratio is 889 females per 1,000 males, with a total of 321,661 males and 286,027 females recorded in 2011. With around 98,000 inhabitants as of 2011, the capital Gangtok is the most significant urban area in the mostly rural state; in 2005, the urban population in Sikkim constituted around 11.06 per cent of the total. In 2011, the average per capita income in Sikkim stood at  81,159 (US$1,305).

Languages 

The official languages of the state are Nepali, Sikkimese, Lepcha and English. Additional official languages include Gurung, Limbu, Magar, Mukhia, Newar, Rai, Sherpa and Tamang for the purpose of preservation of culture and tradition in the state.

Nepali is the lingua franca of Sikkim, while Sikkimese (Bhutia) and Lepcha are spoken in certain areas. English is also spoken and understood in most of Sikkim. Other languages include Dzongkha, Groma, Hindi, Majhi, Majhwar, Thulung, Tibetan, and Yakha.

Ethnicity 
The majority of Sikkim's residents are of Nepali ethnic origin. The native Sikkimese consist of the Bhutias, who migrated from the Kham district of Tibet in the 14th century, and the Lepchas, who are believed to pre-date the Bhutias and are the oldest known inhabitants. Tibetans reside mostly in the northern and eastern reaches of the state. Migrant resident communities include Bengalis, Biharis and Marwaris, who are prominent in commerce in South Sikkim and Gangtok.

Religion 

According to the 2011 census, 57.8% follow Hinduism, making it the state's majority religion. Buddhism is followed by 27.4% of the population, while Christianity is followed by 9.9%. Between 2001 and 2011, Christianity was the fastest growing religion in the state, going from 6.67% to 9.91% of the population. It was thus the fourth state with the highest Christian growth in the period, behind only Arunachal Pradesh, Manipur and Meghalaya. As of 2014, the Evangelical Presbyterian Church of Sikkim is the largest Christian denomination in Sikkim. Hinduism, on the other hand, declined from 60.93% to 57.76% of the population in the same period. Sikkim was the fourth state with the biggest decline in the percentage of Hindus, behind only Arunachal Pradesh, Manipur and Assam. Vajrayana Buddhism, which accounts for 27.3% of the population, is Sikkim's second-largest, yet most prominent religion. Prior to Sikkim's becoming a part of the Indian Union, Vajrayana Buddhism was the state religion under the Chogyal. Sikkim has 75 Buddhist monasteries, the oldest dating back to the 1700s. The public and visual aesthetics of Sikkim are executed in shades of Vajrayana Buddhism and Buddhism plays a significant role in public life, even among Sikkim's majority Nepali Hindu population. Other religious minorities include Muslims of Bihari ethnicity and Jains, who each account for roughly 1% of the population. The traditional religions of the native Sikkimese account for much of the remainder of the population.

Although tensions between the Lepchas and the Nepalese escalated during the merger of Sikkim with India in the 1970s, there has never been any major degree of communal religious violence, unlike in other Indian states. The traditional religion of the Lepcha people is Mun, an animist practice which coexists with Buddhism and Christianity.

Districts
There are 6 districts in Sikkim, each overseen by a Central Government appointee, the district collector, who is in charge of the administration of the civilian areas of the districts. The Indian army has control of a large territory, as the state is a sensitive border area. Many areas are restricted and permits are needed to visit them. 
The four districts are:

Culture

Festivals and holidays

Sikkim's Nepalese majority celebrate all major Hindu festivals, including Tihar (Diwali) and Dashain (Dashera). Traditional local festivals, such as Maghe Sankranti, Ramnavmi, Janmastami, Holi, Shivaratri, Navratri,  Sakela, Chasok Tangnam and Bhimsen Puja, are popular. Losar, Saga Dawa, Lhabab Duechen, Drupka Teshi and Bhumchu are among the Buddhist festivals celebrated in Sikkim. During the Losar (Tibetan New Year), most offices and educational institutions are closed for a week.

Sikkimese Muslims celebrate Eid ul-Fitr and Muharram. Christmas has been promoted in Gangtok to attract tourists during the off-season.

Western rock music and Indian pop have gained a wide following in Sikkim. Nepali rock and Lepcha music are also popular. Sikkim's most popular sports are football and cricket, although hang gliding and river rafting have grown popular as part of the tourism industry.

Cuisine 

Noodle-based dishes such as thukpa, chow mein, thenthuk, fakthu, gyathuk and wonton are common in Sikkim. Momos – steamed dumplings filled with vegetables, chicken, mutton, beef or pork and served with soup – are a popular snack.

Beer, whiskey, rum and brandy are widely consumed in Sikkim, as is tongba, a millet-based alcoholic beverage that is popular in Nepal and Darjeeling. Sikkim has the third-highest per capita alcoholism rate amongst all Indian states, behind Punjab and Haryana.

Media 

In 1957, a Nepali monthly magazine Kanchenjunga became the first news outlet for the masses in Sikkim.

The southern urban areas of Sikkim have English, Nepali and Hindi daily newspapers. Nepali-language newspapers, as well as some English newspapers, are locally printed, whereas Hindi and English newspapers are printed in Siliguri. Important local dailies and weeklies include Hamro Prajashakti (Nepali daily), Himalayan Mirror (English daily), the Samay Dainik, Sikkim Express (English), Kanchanjunga Times (Nepali weekly), Pragya Khabar (Nepali weekly) and Himali Bela. Furthermore, the state receives regional editions of national English newspapers such as The Statesman, The Telegraph, The Hindu and The Times of India. Himalaya Darpan, a Nepali daily published in Siliguri, is one of the leading Nepali daily newspapers in the region. The Sikkim Herald is an official weekly publication of the government. Online media covering Sikkim include the Nepali newspaper Himgiri, the English news portal Haalkhabar and the literary magazine Tistarangit. Avyakta, Bilokan, the Journal of Hill Research, Khaber Khagaj, Panda, and the Sikkim Science Society Newsletter are among other registered publications.

Internet cafés are well established in the district capitals, but broadband connectivity is not widely available. Satellite television channels through dish antennae are available in most homes in the state. Channels served are largely the same as those available in the rest of India, although Nepali-language channels are also available. The main service providers include Airtel digital TV, Tata Sky, Dish TV, DD Free Dish and Nayuma.

Education 

In 2011, Sikkim's adult literacy rate was 82.2 per cent: 87.29 per cent for males and 76.43 per cent for females. There are a total of 1,157 schools in the state, including 765 schools run by the state government, seven central government schools and 385 private schools. There is one Institute of National Importance, one central university and four private universities in Sikkim offering higher education.

Recently, Government of Sikkim has approved the open school board named Board of Open Schooling and Skill Education, BOSSE to provide Secondary Education, Senior Secondary as well as Skill & Vocational Education up to pre-degree level and to provide opportunity to continue education to such students who have missed the opportunity of school education. Sikkim has a National Institute of Technology, currently operating from a temporary campus in Ravangla, South Sikkim, which is one among the ten newly sanctioned NITs by the Government of India under the 11th Five year Plan, 2009. The NIT Sikkim also has state of art super computing facility named PARAM Kanchenjunga which is said to be fastest among all 31 NITs. Sikkim University is the only central university in Sikkim. The public-private funded institution is the Sikkim Manipal University of Technological Sciences, which offers higher education in engineering, medicine and management. It also runs a host of distance education programs in diverse fields.

There are two state-run polytechnic schools – the Advanced Technical Training Centre (ATTC) and the Centre for Computers and Communication Technology (CCCT) – which offer diploma courses in various branches of engineering. ATTC is situated at Bardang, Singtam, and CCCT at Chisopani, Namchi.

Many students, however, migrate to Siliguri, Kolkata, Bangalore and other Indian cities for their higher education.

The campus of the National Institute of Electronics & Information Technology (NIELIT), under the Ministry of Electronics & Information Technology of the Government of India, is at Pakyong in East Sikkim, and offers formal and informal education in the IT/ITES sector.

Towns and cities

The major towns and cities of Sikkim are as follows:

Gangtok, Pakyong, Namchi, Jorethang, Rangpo, Singtam, Gyalshing, Mangan, Soreng, Pelling, Rhenock, Rongli, Rorathang, Ravangla, Chungthang, Ranipool, Lachen, Nayabazar, Lachung, Dikchu, Majitar, Legship, Melli, Yuksom, Sherathang, Namthang, Rinchenpong, Singhik, Hee Burmiok, Tashiding, Kumrek,  Makha, Yangang, and Damthang.

Sports
The popular sports played in Sikkim include football, cricket, archery, volleyball, tennis, badminton, and athletics. Adventure sports like paragliding, Hiking and mountain biking are also popular in Sikkim. 
The stadiums of Sikkim are as follows:
 Mining Cricket Stadium, Rangpo
 Paljor Stadium,  Gangtok
 Bhaichung Stadium, Namchi
 Resithang Athletics Stadium, Gangtok.

See also 
 Outline of Sikkim
 East Sikkim district

References

Further reading and bibliography 
 
 
 
 
 
 Forbes, Andrew; Henley, David (2011). 'The Tea Horse Road from Lhasa to Sikkim'. China's Ancient Tea Horse Road. Chiang Mai: Cognoscenti Books.
 
 Hooker, Joseph Dalton (1854). Himalayan Journals: notes of a naturalist in Bengal, the Sikkim and Nepal Himalayas, the Khasia mountains etc. Ward, Lock, Bowden & Co.
 
 Ray, Arundhati; Das, Sujoy (2001). Sikkim: A Traveller's Guide. Orient Blackswan, New Delhi. .
 
 
 Holidaying in Sikkim and Bhutan. Nest and Wings. .
 Sikkim – Land of Mystic and Splendour. Sikkim Tourism. 
 Manorama Yearbook 2003. .

External links

Government
  
 Official website of Sikkim Tourism

General information
 
 

 
Northeast India
States and territories established in 1975
Tibetan Buddhist places
1975 establishments in India
Former British colonies and protectorates in Asia
States and union territories of India